An itinerant court was a migratory form of government, common in European kingdoms in the Early Middle Ages.

It was an alternative to having a capital city, a permanent political centre from which a kingdom is governed. Especially medieval Western Europe was characterised by a political rule where the highest political authorities frequently changed their location, bringing with them parts of the country's central government on their journey. Such a realm therefore had no real centre, and no permanent seat of government. Itinerant courts were gradually replaced from the thirteenth century, when stationary royal residences began to develop into modern capital cities.

Holy Roman Empire

This manner of ruling a country is particularly strongly associated with German history, where the emergence of a capital city took an unusually long time. The German itinerant regime (Reisekönigtum) was, from the Frankish period and up to late medieval times, the usual form of royal or imperial government. The Holy Roman Emperors, in the Middle Ages and even later, did not rule from any permanent central residence. They constantly traveled, with their family and court, through the kingdom.

The Holy Roman Empire did not have a capital city. The emperor and other princes ruled by constantly changing their residence. Imperial dwelling-places were typically palaces built by the Crown, sometimes episcopal cities. The routes followed by the court during the journeys are usually called "itineraries". Palaces were notably erected in accessible, fertile areas - surrounded by Crown mansions, where imperial rights to local resources existed. These princely estates were scattered around the whole country. The composition of the ruler's retinue changed constantly, depending on what area the court was passing through, and which noblemen joined their master on the trip, or left him again.

During the course of a year, impressive distances were covered. The travel speed of the German itinerant court was normally between 20 and 30 kilometres a day. In 1146, Conrad III of Germany could travel as fast as 66 kilometres a day on his journey from Frankfurt to Weinheim.

In other countries

The itinerant court is often conceived as a typically German institution. Medieval Germany was, however, not the only kingdom ruled this way; it was also the case in most other contemporary European countries, where terms like "corte itinerante" describe this phenomenon. Kings and their companions traveled continuously from one royal palace to the next. The old Parliament of Scotland assembled in many different places, Scotland being ruled by an itinerant court in early historical sources. In Saxon England, conditions were the same.

A more centralized way of ruling did evolve during this time, but only slowly and gradually. London and Paris began to develop into permanent political centers from the late 1300s, when Lisbon also showed similar tendencies. (Spain, on the other hand, lacked a fixed royal residence until Philip II elevated El Escorial outside Madrid to this rank.) Smaller kingdoms had a similar, but slower development.

Emperor Charles V made 40 journeys during his lifetime, travelling from country to country with no single fixed capital city and it is estimated that he spent a quarter of his reign on the road. He made ten trips to the Low Countries, nine to German-speaking lands, seven to Spain, seven to Italian states, four to France, two to England, and two to North Africa. As he put it in his last public speech "my life has been one long journey". 

During all his travels, Charles V left a documentary trail in almost every place he went, allowing historians to surmise that he spent almost half his life (over 10,000 days) in the Low Countries, and almost one-third (6,500 days) in Spain. He spent more than 3000 days in what is now Germany and almost 1,000 days in Italy. He spent 195 days in France, 99 in North Africa and 44 days in England. For 260 days his exact location is unrecorded, all of them being days spent at sea travelling between his dominions.

The evolving capital city

Germany never developed a fixed capital city during the medieval or early modern period. "Multizentralität" remained its alternative solution: a decentralized state where the governmental functions never ended up in just one place until the late modern period.

England was very different in this respect. Central political power was permanently established in London approximately in the middle of the fourteenth century, but London's outstanding position as a financial centre had been firmly established many centuries earlier. A monarch like King Henry II of England (1133-1189) was evidently attracted by its great wealth, but he was hesitant about taking up residence there. During his reign, London was becoming as near to an economic capital as the conditions of the age allowed. But its very prosperity and its extensive liberties forbade it as a desirable place of residence for the king and his court, and stood in the way of its becoming a political capital. 

The king often wished to be near the great city, but he claimed the same power to control his own court that the citizens demanded to govern their own city. The only way to avoid conflict between the household jurisdiction and the municipal jurisdiction was for the king to keep away from the latter much of the time. He could only be in the city as a guest or a conqueror. Accordingly, he seldom ventured within the city walls. He established himself on such occasions either in the Tower fortress or at his palace of Westminster just outside the City of London.

London was the natural leader among English towns. In order to control England, it was necessary for the kings to control London first. London was too powerful to control, and it took centuries before the monarchs settled down there. They tried, unsuccessfully, to drive the London merchants out of business by making Westminster a rival economic centre. They tried to find some other suitable place in the Kingdom where they could deposit their archives, which were gradually growing too large and heavy to be transported with them on their unending journeys.

York tended towards becoming a political capital during times of war with Scotland. The Hundred Years' War against France caused the political centre of gravity to shift to the southern parts of England, where London was dominant. Gradually, many of the institutions of the State ceased to follow the king on his journeys, and established themselves permanently in London: the Treasury, Parliament, and the court. Last of all, the king experienced a need to take up permanent residence in London himself. It was only possible for him to make London his capital city after he had become powerful enough to "tame the financial metropolis" and transform it into an obedient tool of the State authority.

The English historical example clearly shows that a political centre does not naturally evolve at the same place as the economically most important place in a given country. It has a certain tendency of doing so, admittedly. Centralizing and centrifugal forces counteracted each other at this time, at the same time as wealth was both an attractive and a repelling force vis-à-vis the rulers.

Purpose 

A migrating form of political was an inherent feature of the feudalism that succeeded the more centralised Roman Empire. In Eastern Europe, Constantinople retained the characteristics of a political capital city much more than any western city.

This travelling government enabled a better surveillance of the realm. The king's nomadic lifestyle also facilitated control over local magnates, strengthening national cohesion. Medieval government was for a long time a system of personal relationships, rather than an administration of geographic areas. Therefore, the ruler had to "personally" deal with his subordinates. This "oral" culture gradually, during medieval times, gave way to a "documentary" type of rule - based on written communication, which generated archives, making stationary rule increasingly more attractive to the kings.

Originally, rulers also needed to travel in order to meet the court's financial needs - because contemporary inadequate transportation facilities simply did not allow a large group of people to stay permanently in one place. Instead of sending resources to the government, the government wandered to the resources. In many countries, however, the travelling kingship persisted throughout the 16th century or even longer. When food supplies and other necessities were normally transferred to the place where the court resided for the moment. 

Consequently, these pure economic benefits must have been clearly less decisive than the political importance of travelling. The transition from a state with an itinerant court to a state ruled from a capital city was a reflection of how an "oral" way of life, when kings could win loyalty only by personally meeting their subjects face to face, gave way to a "documentary" rule, when the ruler was able to rule simply by letting his incipient bureaucracy send them a written message.

Bibliography 
 Aretin, Karl Otmar von (1983): Das Reich ohne Hauptstadt? In: Hauptstädte in europäischen Nationalstaaten. ed T Schieder & G Brunn, Munich/Vienna.
 Berges, Wilhelm (1952): Das Reich ohne Hauptstadt. In: Das Hauptstadtproblem in der Geschichte Tübingen.
 Bernhardt, John W. (1993): Itinerant kingship and royal monasteries in early medieval Germany, 936–1075. CUP, Cambridge, .
 Brühl, Carlrichard (1968): Fodrum, Gistum, Servitium Regis. Cologne/Graz.
 Braudel, Fernand (1973): Capitalism and material life 1400-1800, Harper & Row, New York.
 Ennen, Edith (1983): Funktions- und Bedeutungswandel der 'Hauptstadt' vom Mittelalter zur Moderne. In: Hauptstädte in europäischen Nationalstaaten ed. Theodor Schieder & Gerhard Brunn, Munich/Vienna.
 Febvre, Lucien (1977): Life in renaissance France, editet and translated by Marian Rothstein, Harvard University Press. Harvard.
 Fernández, Luis (1981a): España en tiempo de Felipe II, Historia de España, ed R Menéndez Pidal, tomo XXII, vol I, cuarta edición, Madrid.
 Fernández, Luis (1981b): España en tiempo de Felipe II, Historia de España, ed R Menéndez Pidal, tomo XXII, vol II, cuarta edición, Madrid.
 Graus, František (1979): Prag als Mitte Böhmens. In: Zentralität als Problem der mittelalterlichen Stadtgeschichtsforschung. ed. F Meynen, Vienna/Cologne.
 Guenee, Bernard (1985): States and rulers in later medieval Europe. Glasgow.
 Hardy, Thomas Duffus (1835): A Description of the Patent Rolls, London.
 Hermann, Oliver (2000): Lothar III. und sein Wirkungsbereich. Räumliche Bezüge königlichen Handelns im hochmittelalterlichen Reich (1125–1137). Winkler, Bochum, .
 Jusserand, J.J. (1921): English wayfaring life in the Middle Ages (XIVth century), 2nd revised and enlarged edition, London.
 Martens, Mina (1964): Bruxelles, capitale de fait sous les Bourgignons. In: Vierteljahrschrift für Wirtschafts- und Sozialgeschichte. II.
 Opll, Ferdinand (1978): Das itinerar Kaiser Friedrichs Barbarossa. Vienna/Cologne/Graz.
 Orning, Hans Jacob (2008): Unpredictability and presence - Norwegian Kingship in the High Middle Ages. Leiden/Boston.
 Peyer, Hans Conrad (1964): Das Reisekönigtum des Mittelalters. In: Vierteljahrschrift für Sozial- und Wirtschaftsgeschichte. ed. Hermann Aubin, vol 51, Wiesbaden, pp. 1–21.
 Roloff, Gustav (1952): Hauptstadt und Staat in Frankreich. In: Das Hauptstadtproblem in der Geschichte. Tübingen.
 Reinke, Martina (1987): Die Reisegeschwindigkeit des deutschen Königshofes im 11. und 12. Jahrhundert nördlich der Alpen. In: Blätter für deutsche Landesgeschichte 128.
 Sawyer, Peter (1983): The royal tun in pre-conquest England. In: Ideal and reality in Frankish and Anglo-Saxon society, Oxford.
 Stretton, Grace (1935): The travelling household in the Middle Ages. In: The Journal of the British Archaeological Association, new series, vol 40, London.
 Strömberg, J.B.L.D. (2004): The Swedish Kings in Progress – and the Centre of Power. In: Scandia. 70:2, Lund.
 Strömberg, J.B.L.D. (2013): De svenska resande kungarna – och maktens centrum. (The Swedish travelling kingdom –and the center of power) Uppsala. Samlingar utgivna av Svenska fornskriftsällskapet. Serie 1. Svenska skrifter 97, 557 pp. . English summary:
 Tout, Thomas Frederick (1934): The beginnings of a modern capital, London and Westminster in the fourteenth century. In: The collected papers of Thomas Frederick Tout vol III, Manchester.

Footnotes

External links 
 http://www.koenigspfalzen.mpg.de/projekt.html
 https://web.archive.org/web/20170424223957/http://www.ottonenzeit.de/musik/reisekong/reisek1.htm
 https://web.archive.org/web/20160402142358/http://www.reich-deutsches.de/mittel_4.html

Medieval politics
Medieval organizations
Royal and noble courts